West Virginia Broadband is a Wireless community network located in Braxton County, West Virginia operated by local volunteers and coordinated by the Gilmer-Braxton Research Zone. The effort gained recent attention by a National Public Radio story and MuniWireless and SmartMobs bloggers detailing how modified off-the-shelf Wi-Fi adapters were used to connect 7 communities with wireless internet for a total cost of little more than 4000 US dollars. The research group now coordinates wireless technology training throughout the United States.

References

Wireless network organizations
Community networks
Braxton County, West Virginia